Dowkal Pahan (also known as Berkeh-ye Now (Persian: بركه نو), Berkeh-ye Nūḩ, and Birkeh Nūh) is a village in Kohurestan Rural District, in the Central District of Khamir County, Hormozgan Province, Iran. At the 2006 census, its population was 99, in 21 families.

References 

Populated places in Khamir County